SP!RE is a high-rise condominium building located at 70 Adelaide Street East at Church Street in downtown Toronto, Ontario, Canada by Context Developments. Construction was completed in 2007.

The structure was designed by Peter Clewes of architectsAlliance and is 145 metres tall with 322 suites (from 42m² to 228m²) in 45 floors.

Education
The tower has been assigned to the following schools in the Toronto District School Board:
Elementary and Intermediate: Market Lane Public School (Kindergarten through 8th Grade) 
Secondary: Jarvis Collegiate Institute
Technical: Central Technical School
Commercial: West Toronto Collegiate Institute  or Northern Secondary School (Residents may attend either school)

The closest post-secondary institutions are George Brown College, Toronto Metropolitan University, OCAD University and University of Toronto.

External links
Emporis Listing

Residential skyscrapers in Toronto
Residential buildings completed in 2007
Modernist architecture in Canada